Tejaa Devkar (also spelled Deokar) is an Indian actress who has acted in Marathi language television series and films.

Early life 

Tejaa was born to Suresh and Neeta Deokar in Mumbai, and she has done her doctorate in English Literature. Suresh is a businessman in Mumbai, and Neeta had produced a couple of Marathi films.

Acting career 

Tejaa has worked in many Marathi movies and is associated with many serials aired on different channels. she has won many awards in various category.

She began her career in 2005 with the Marathi movie Hirwa Kunku, a family drama which did well at the box office, especially in the remote places in Maharashtra.

She has acted in many other Marathi movies including Oxygen, Dharpakad, Khandaobacha Lagin, Radhika, Shambhu Majha Navsacha, Natee and Adla Badli.

In Dharpakad she had played a kabbadi sportsman, in Khandobacha lagin she plays an adivasi girl, in Shambhu majha navsacha she played a negative role, whereas in Adla Badla she played a comic role. In Neeta Devkar's Oxygen, she played a housewife.

Filmography 
 Hirwa Kunku
 Oxygen
 Chal Dhar Pakad
 Khandobacha Lagin
 adla badli
 May Mauli Manudevi
 Shambhu Maza Navsacha 
 Sasu Cha Swayamwar
 Bharla Malwat Rakhtaana
 Nati
 Boom Boom Bajirav
 Raadhika
 Nazar
 1234
 Bharla Malvat Raktana 
 Topiwale Kavale 
 Khel Tamasha
 Tuch Khari Gharchi Lakshmi 
 Mulga
 Jaavai Maazha Navasacha
 Aar Aar Aaba Aata Tari Thamba
 Karz Kunkavache
 Mahercha Daivat
 Thank You Vitthala
 Pani Bani

Television 
 Vrundavan ( Mi Marathi )as "Kartiki".
 Kulswamini ( Star Pravah )
 May Lek (ETV Marathi)
 Ek Zhunj Vadalashi (ETV Marathi)
 Chimanipankh ( DD Sahyadri )

References

External links

 
 

Indian television actresses
Actresses from Mumbai
Living people
Year of birth missing (living people)
Indian film actresses
Actresses in Marathi cinema
Actresses in Marathi television
21st-century Indian actresses